Jermaine Jay Charles Lawson (born 13 January 1982) is a former professional cricketer. A fast bowler from Jamaica, he played at Test and One Day International (ODI) level for the West Indies during the early 2000s, becoming the fourth West Indian to take a Test hat-trick. Lawson later moved to the United States, and made his debut for the American national cricket team at the World Cricket League Division Three tournament in October 2014.

Career
Born in Spanish Town, Jamaica Lawson attended the St Catherine Cricket Club as a youngster. He eventually became a fast bowler capable of bowling over 95 mph. At the age of 20 he made his debut for the West Indies in an away test match against India, picking up the wickets of both Rahul Dravid and Sachin Tendulkar. He went on to claim figures of 6 for 3 against Bangladesh in only his third test match. Lawson later earned a hat-trick, claiming the wickets of Brett Lee, Stuart MacGill and Justin Langer, in an eventual haul of 7/78 during the final Test of Australia's 2003/04 tour of the Caribbean.

He was though soon reported, on 11 May 2003, for a suspect bowling action by the International Cricket Council. After undergoing a period of extensive remedial work, he returned to Test cricket in mid-2004, but stress fractures came to the fore along with another report of his action in July 2005. However, he was eventually cleared by the International Cricket Council on that second report of a suspect bowling action.

On 29 February 2008 Lawson joined English side Leicestershire as a Kolpak player for the upcoming county cricket season. During 2014 Lawson migrated to the United States of America and qualified to play for the USA's cricket team four years later.

Personal life
Lawson is the father of three sons. He currently lives in East New York.

References

1982 births
Living people
Cricketers at the 2003 Cricket World Cup
Jamaican cricketers
American cricketers
Leicestershire cricketers
West Indies One Day International cricketers
West Indies Test cricketers
People from Saint Catherine Parish
Test cricket hat-trick takers
Jamaica cricketers
West Indies B cricketers
Jamaican emigrants to the United States